Jason Owen may refer to:

 Jason Owen (singer) (born c. 1994), Australian singer
 Jason Owen (talent manager) (born c. 1976), American music talent manager